The 1996–97 UMass Minutemen basketball team represented the University of Massachusetts Amherst during the 1996–97 NCAA Division I men's basketball season. The Minutemen, led by first year head coach Bruiser Flint, played their home games at William D. Mullins Memorial Center and are members of the Atlantic 10 Conference. The team finished the season 19–14, 11–5 in A-10 play to finish in third place. In the postseason, the team lost in the quarterfinal of the A-10 tournament and in the first round of the NCAA tournament.

Roster

Schedule

|-
!colspan=9| Regular season

|-
!colspan=9| 1997 Atlantic 10 men's basketball tournament

|-
!colspan=9| 1997 NCAA Division I men's basketball tournament

Rankings

References

UMass Minutemen basketball seasons
Umass